The Hooping Life is a 2010 documentary film directed by Amy Goldstein. The film had its world premiere in April 2010 at the Sarasota Film Festival, and focuses on the history of hooping.

Synopsis
The film takes a look at the subculture of hula hooping, which was primarily spearheaded by women. Narrated by Shaquille O’Neal, the documentary follows several people who participate in the subculture, incorporating it into their daily lives in various different ways.

Cast
Shaquille O’Neal as the Narrator (voice)
Hoopalicious
Baxter
Hoopgirl
Tisha
Jeffrey
Karis
Groovehoops
Sass

References

External links 
 
 
 The Hooping Life at the International Documentary Association

2010 films
American documentary films
Documentary films about fandom
2010s English-language films
2010s American films